Roper House may refer to:

Charles and Theresa Roper House, Newport, Oregon
Roper House Complex, Pickens County, South Carolina
Robert William Roper House, Charleston, South Carolina